Kershawia is a genus of long-jointed beetles in the family Tenebrionidae. There is one described species in Kershawia, K. rugiceps, found in Australia.

References

Silvanidae genera
Monotypic Cucujiformia genera